was the second of the five  light cruisers in the Imperial Japanese Navy, which played an active role in World War II.  Tama was named after the Tama River in Kantō region of Japan.

Background
At the end of 1917, plans for an additional six Tenryū-class vessels, plus three new-design 7,200 ton-class scouting cruisers were shelved, in favor of an intermediate 5,500 ton-class vessel which could be used as both a long-range, high speed scout ship, and also as a command vessel for destroyer or submarine flotillas.

Design

The Kuma-class vessels were essentially enlarged versions of the Tenryū-class cruisers, with greater speed, range, and weaponry. The number of 14 cm/50 3rd Year Type naval guns was increased from three on the Tenryū class to seven on the Kuma class and provision was made for 48 naval mines. However, the two triple torpedo launchers on the Tenryū class was reduced to two double launchers, and the Kuma class remained highly deficient in anti-aircraft protection, with only two 8 cm/40 3rd Year Type naval guns.

Service record

Early career
Tama was completed at Mitsubishi Heavy Industries Nagasaki shipyard on 29 January 1921. Immediately after commissioning, Tama was assigned to cover the landings of Japanese troops in Siberia during Japan's Siberian Intervention against the Bolshevik Red Army.

In 1925, Tama was tasked with making a diplomatic voyage to San Pedro in the United States, to return the remains of US Ambassador to Japan, Edgar Bancroft, who had died in Tokyo.

In 1932, with the Manchurian Incident, Tama was assigned to patrol the northern coasts of China, from its base in Taiwan. As the war in China continued to escalate, Tama was involved in operations to cover the landings of Japanese troops in central China.

On 10 January 1935, the German naval attaché in Tokyo, Captain Paul Wenneker was invited by Admiral Nobumasa Suetsugu to tour Tama, battleship  and submarine  at Yokosuka Naval District. Wenneker was reportedly unimpressed with Japanese naval artillery, and advocated increased use of submarine warfare.

Northern operations
On 10 September 1941, Tama became flagship of Vice Admiral Boshirō Hosogaya's CruDiv 21 with the light cruiser , in the IJN 5th Fleet. Tama and Kiso were sent north to Hokkaidō, in Arctic white camouflage on 2 December, and were patrolling in the Kurile Islands, at the time of the attack on Pearl Harbor. Both cruisers' hulls were damaged by severe weather, and both were forced to return to dry dock at Yokosuka by the end of the year.

On 21 January 1942, CruDiv 21 departed Yokosuka and was again sent north on patrols around Hokkaidō, but was recalled after 38 aircraft of Task Force 16 made a dawn raid on Marcus Island on 5 March.

On 5 April, CruDiv 21 returned to northern waters, but on 18 April the Doolittle Raid struck targets in Tokyo, Yokohama, Osaka, Nagoya and Kobe. Tama was again recalled to join in another unsuccessful pursuit of Halsey. For the rest of April and most of May, Tama resumed its northern patrols.

On 28 May, Tama departed Mutsu Bay to participate in the "Operation AL" (the seizure of Attu and Kiska) in the Battle of the Aleutian Islands. After successfully landing forces to seize the islands, CruDiv 21 returned to Mutsu Bay on 23 June. However, Tama was quickly sent back to cover the second reinforcement convoy to Kiska, then patrolled southwest of Kiska in anticipation of an American counter-attack until 2 August. After a brief return to Yokosuka for maintenance, Tama covered the transfer of the Attu garrison to Kiska. On 25 October, CruDiv 21 embarked further reinforcements at Kashiwabara, Paramushiro to Attu. Tama continued to patrol the Aleutians and the Kurile islands and around Hokkaidō until 6 January 1943, making another supply run to Kiska in November. After refit at Yokosuka in early February 1943, Tama again patrolled north from Ōminato Guard District to Kataoka (Simushir island), to Kashiwabara (Paramushiro) to 7 March. Another major supply run to Attu was made from 7–13 March.

At the Battle of the Komandorski Islands on 26 March, against USN Task Group 16.6 with the light cruiser , heavy cruiser  and four destroyers, in a four-hour running gun and torpedo battle, Salt Lake City and destroyer  were damaged by gunfire. The other destroyers were not damaged. During the battle, Tama fired 136 shells and four torpedoes, and received two hits in return, which damaged her catapult and wounding one crewman, however Nachi was hit several times; and the Japanese aborted the resupply mission, returning to Paramushiro on 28 March. Disgraced by retreating from an inferior force, Hosogaya was relieved of command and forced to retire. Vice Admiral Shiro Kawase assumed command of the Fifth Fleet.
Tama remained on guard duty at Kataoka for over a month and then was sent to Maizuru Naval Arsenal for a refit on 4 May. She was thus absent during the "American Operation Landcrab" to retake the Aleutian Islands, and during Japanese evacuation of Kiska on 19 May. Returning to Kataoka only on 23 May, Tama resumed guard duties until 5 July. During "Operation Ke-Go" (the evacuation of Kiska) on 7 July, Tamas engines were considered too unreliable for her to participate directly in the evacuation, and she remained behind at Paramushiro. In any event, the mission was aborted due to weather. Tama remained on guard duty in the Kuriles until 30 August.

Operations in southern waters
After a refit at Yokosuka Naval Arsenal, Tama was sent south with troops and supplies for Ponape, Caroline Islands on 15 September. After stopping by Truk, and returning to Kure, Tama was ordered to Shanghai on 11 October, to ferry additional troops to Truk and Rabaul, New Britain. After disembarking the reinforcements at Rabaul, she was attacked by RAAF Bristol Beaufort bombers from Guadalcanal on 21 October. Tamas hull plates were damaged by near-misses and she was forced return to Rabaul for emergency repairs.

On 27 October, Tama returned to Yokosuka for a major refit; her Nos. 5 and No.7 140-mm guns were removed along with her aircraft catapult and derrick. A twin 127-mm HA gun was fitted, as were four triple mount and six single mount Type 96 25-mm AA guns. This brought Tamas total number of 25-mm guns to 22 barrels (4x3, 2x2, 6x1). A type 21 air search radar was also fitted. Repairs and modifications were completed on 9 December.

Tama departed Yokosuka on 24 December, again for northern waters, and remained on patrol until 19 June 1944. Returning to Yokosuka by 22 June, Tama then began operations to ferry Imperial Japanese Army reinforcements to the Ogasawara islands, making two runs to 12 August.

On 30 August, Tama was transferred from CruDiv 21, Fifth Fleet to become flagship of DesRon 11, Combined Fleet, replacing the lost .

Battle of Leyte Gulf
During the Battle of Leyte Gulf (20 October 1944), Tama was assigned to Vice Admiral Jisaburō Ozawa Northern Mobile ("Decoy") Force. Tama was attacked by TBM Avenger torpedo bombers from VT-21 of Belleau Wood and VT-51 from San Jacinto. A Mark 13 torpedo hit Tama in her No. 2 boiler room. After emergency repairs, Tama retired from the battle, escorted by the cruiser , but Isuzu was ordered to protect the damaged aircraft carrier . Tama was then escorted by destroyer , but later Shimotsuki too was ordered off to assist the damaged carrier . Tama proceeded alone at  towards Okinawa.

Northeast of Luzon, Tamas luck ran out, as the submarine  — on her first war patrol — picked up Tama on radar.

Tama was removed from the navy list on 20 December 1944.

References

Notes

Books

External links

Kuma-class cruisers
Tama
1920 ships
Second Sino-Japanese War cruisers of Japan
World War II cruisers of Japan
Ships sunk by American submarines
World War II shipwrecks in the South China Sea
Maritime incidents in October 1944
Ships of the Aleutian Islands campaign
Ships lost with all hands